I Love Your Glasses is the debut album by Spanish indie folk singer Russian Red.  It was released in 2008.

Track listing
 Cigarettes
 No Past Land
 They Don't Believe
 Gone, Play On
 Hold It Inside
 Nice Thick Feathers
 Kiss My Elbow
 Take Me Home
 Walls Are Tired
 Timing Is Crucial
 Just Like a Wall
 Girls Just Want to Have Fun

References

2008 debut albums
Russian Red albums
PIAS Recordings albums